The 2018 Delray Beach Open was a professional tennis tournament played on hard courts. It was the 26th edition of the tournament, and part of the World Tour 250 category of the 2018 ATP World Tour. It took place in Delray Beach, United States between February 19 and February 25, 2018. Unseeded Frances Tiafoe, who entered the draw on a wildcard, won the singles title.

Singles main-draw entrants

Seeds

1 Rankings as of February 12, 2018

Other entrants 
The following players received wildcards into the main draw:
  John Isner
  Reilly Opelka
  Frances Tiafoe

The following players received entry from the qualifying draw:
  Alexander Bublik 
  Ramkumar Ramanathan
  Franko Skugor 
  John-Patrick Smith

The following players received entry as lucky losers:
  Darian King
  Cameron Norrie
  Peter Polansky

Withdrawals 
Before the tournament
  Kevin Anderson → replaced by  Darian King
  Nick Kyrgios → replaced by  Cameron Norrie
  Adrian Mannarino → replaced by  Peter Polansky

Doubles main-draw entrants

Seeds 

1 Rankings are as of February 12, 2018.

Other entrants 
The following pairs received wildcards into the main draw:
  Taylor Fritz /  Stefan Kozlov
  Peter Polansky /  Denis Shapovalov

The following pair received entry as alternates:
  Darian King /  Anderson Reed

Withdrawals 
Before the tournament
  Sam Querrey

Finals

Singles 

  Frances Tiafoe defeated  Peter Gojowczyk, 6–1, 6–4

Doubles 

  Jack Sock /  Jackson Withrow defeated  Nicholas Monroe /  John-Patrick Smith, 4–6, 6–4, [10–8]

References

External links
Official website

Delray Beach Open
Delray Beach Open
Delray Beach Open
Delray Beach
Delray Beach Open